Manuel Amadeu de Matos Matias, known as Matias (born 18 March 1964) is a Portuguese football manager and a former player. He currently manages Pasteleira.

He played 13 seasons and 272 games in the Primeira Liga for Salgueiros, Vitória de Guimarães, União da Madeira, Leça, Gil Vicente, Vitória de Setúbal and Porto.

Club career
He made his Primeira Liga debut for Salgueiros on 13 March 1983 in a game against Porto.

Honours

Porto
Primeira Liga champion: 1995–96.

References

1964 births
Footballers from Porto
Living people
Portuguese footballers
S.C. Salgueiros players
Primeira Liga players
Liga Portugal 2 players
Rio Ave F.C. players
C.F. União players
Vitória S.C. players
FC Porto players
Vitória F.C. players
Gil Vicente F.C. players
Portuguese football managers
A.D. Nogueirense managers
Portuguese expatriate football managers
Expatriate football managers in Saudi Arabia
Expatriate football managers in Iran
Académico de Viseu F.C. managers
Expatriate football managers in Iraq
S.R. Almancilense managers
Association football defenders